The 2017–18 Korisliiga season was the 78th season of the top professional basketball league in Finland. The season started on 28 September 2017 and ended on 18 May 2018. Kataja Basket were the defending champions, but Kauhajoki Karhu achieved their first title ever.

Format
The eleven teams will play four teams against each one of the other teams for a total of 40 games. The eight best qualified teams will join the playoffs.

Teams

Espoo United promoted from First Division and no team was relegated.

Regular season

Standings

Playoffs
The quarter-finals and semi-finals were played in a best-of-three 1–1–1–1–1 format. The finals were played in a best-of-seven playoff format.

Bracket

Quarterfinals

|}

Semifinals

|}

Third place game

Final

|}

Clubs in European competitions

References

External links
Official website

Korisliiga seasons
Finnish
Koris